Sankt Michael may refer to:

places in Austria:
Sankt Michael im Burgenland, a municipality in Burgenland
Sankt Michael im Lungau, a municipality in Salzburg
Sankt Michael in Obersteiermark, a municipality in Styria
churches in Germany
St. Michael's Church, Hildesheim, in Hildesheim
St. Michael, Fulda, in Fulda
St Michael in Berg am Laim (München), in Munich 
St. Michael's Church, Munich, in Munich